The Iron Triangle was a key communist Chinese and North Korean concentration area and communications junction during the Korean War, located in the central sector between Cheorwon and Gimhwa-eup in the south and Pyonggang in the north. The area was located 20 to 30 miles (30 to 50 kilometres) above the 38th parallel in the diagonal corridor dividing the Taebaek Mountains into northern and southern ranges and contained the major road and rail links between the port of Wonsan in the northeast and Seoul in the southwest. During the war the area was the scene of heavy fighting between the Chinese People's Volunteer Army and the US Eighth Army during the Battle of White Horse and the Battle of Triangle Hill in October–November 1952. The Battle of Pork Chop Hill in March–July 1953 took place to the west of the Iron Triangle. This complex was eventually named the "Iron Triangle" by newsmen searching for a dramatic term. Today, the region straddles the Demilitarized Zone.

Notes

References

 
 

Battles of the Korean War involving the United States
Battles of the Korean War involving South Korea
Battles of the Korean War involving Belgium
Korean War